Bantayan Airport is an aerodrome serving Bantayan Island in the province of Cebu in the Philippines. It is classified as a community airport by the Civil Aviation Authority of the Philippines (CAAP). Since the beginning of 2018, management of the airport has moved from CAAP to Mactan–Cebu International Airport Authority (MCIAA).

Structure
Bantayan Airport is a small community airstrip with a paved runway but no services (no refuelling capabilities). The largest handling capacity is now an 80-passenger aeroplane. The terminal shed was erected in 2003, along with two security fences and the airport gate, as part of an airport improvement program initiated by the CAAP.

Airlines and destinations

Salient dates

 there is doubt about the future of the airport.  CAAP wishes to cease funding it. However President Aquino, who flew into Bantayan airport for his first island visit in February 2014, is interested in the development of the airport.

In October 2015 meanwhile, a private entrepreneur tried to appropriate it.

 it was reported that initial work was under way on the construction project to build new airports at Bantayan and Camotes. The initial project phase is to determine a suitable location for the new airport, implying that it may be at an entirely different location on the island.

 CAAP stopped operation of Bantayan airstrip, due to the airport's dilapidated state.

 the authority to manage the airport in Bantayan Island transferred from the Civil Aviation Authority of the Philippines (CAAP) to the Mactan Cebu International Airport Authority (MCIAA).

 Bantayan airport terminal, runway extension to be completed by end of 2020.

 the construction is at its last phase, and the airport open to business in December 2020.

References

Sources

Airports in the Philippines
Buildings and structures in Cebu